Chris Liebing (born Christopher Liebing on 11 December 1968) is a German techno DJ, music producer and radio host and the founder of the record label CLR.

Liebing was born in Gießen, Hesse. In the early 1990s, he became active on the Frankfurt dance music scene. He opened the Spinclub techno club in 1994, and worked at Eye Q Records in Frankfurt. He formed his first label, 'Audio' in 1996, which was followed in 1999 by CLR.

In 2004, he released the philosophy-themed Evolution, which took two years to make. The album was described by CMJ New Music Report as "a techno album to go to war with".

In 2005, he worked with Speedy J on the Collabs 3000: Metalism album, released by Novamute. The album was described by Billboard as "one of the year's best collections of original electronic music".

In 2009, he launched the CLR Podcast, which was made available every Monday via iTunes and CLR's own website. The podcast was voiced by Liebing and featured guest mixes from a wide variety of techno DJs. Amongst the more notable guests was Depeche Mode's Martin Gore. The podcast ran weekly until 2015 when the 315th and final episode was broadcast. It was replaced by a new weekly podcast entitled am/fm, which features only mixes and live recordings by Chris Liebing himself.

Liebing has played at Space and Amnesia in Ibiza, Fabric in London, Berghain in Berlin, Cocoricò in Riccione and large festivals such as Time Warp. In 2018, Liebing launched his first album in eight years: Burn Slow on Mute Records. The album included vocal contributions from artists such as Gary Numan and Polly Scattergood. The album art was derived from a painting by Jan Brueghel the Younger.

Chris became a vegan in 2011.

He created a new show called AM/FM in 2015.

References

External links
 Chris Liebing Recordings
 Chris Liebing at Discogs
 Chris Liebing tracklisting archive
 Chris Liebing on The DJ List

Living people
German DJs
German electronic musicians
German techno musicians
1968 births
Electronic dance music DJs